Wami Bridge is a bridge in Tanzania that crosses the Wami River. It lies on the A14 highway between Chalinze and Segera junctions.

References

Bridges in Tanzania